Gary Anthony Siplin (born October 21, 1954 in Orlando, Florida) was a Democratic member of the Florida Senate, representing the 19th District from 2003. Previously he was a member of the Florida House of Representatives from 2000 through 2002.

Siplin earned a  B.A. in political science from Johnson C. Smith University, where he became a member of Omega Psi Phi fraternity. He then attended the University of Pittsburgh, earning an M.A. in Public and International Affairs.  His Juris Doctor was earned at the Duquesne University School of Law.

In 2006, he was convicted of third-degree felony grand theft of $5,000 or more, as well as a misdemeanor statutory violation, for using the services of employees for his candidacy.  Siplin, however, enjoyed support from leaders in both political parties. In addition to members of the Democratic Party, Florida Senate President Ken Pruitt, a Republican, refused to call for the expulsion of Siplin from the Legislature until his appeals were exhausted.

On December 28, 2007, the Florida Fifth District Court of Appeal reversed his convictions and remanded the case to the trial court with directions that Siplin be acquitted of the felony charge, and that prosecutors be given permission to retry him on the misdemeanor charge.

Siplin ran for his Senate seat again in 2014, losing to incumbent Geraldine Thompson in the primary by a hair.

Legislation

Sagging Pants Legislation
Siplin sponsored SB 228, the "droopy drawers" bill in 2011. The bill would require Florida public school districts to add a ban on sagging pants to their dress codes. This legislation was enacted by Governor Scott in May 2011.

In-State Tuition for Non-Citizens
Siplin sponsored Florida's version of the DREAM Act.  The act would allow for in-state tuition for undocumented students. The bill was killed in the Senate Judiciary Committee, by a vote of 4-3.

Trayvon Martin
Siplin sponsored a letter to Governor Rick Scott proposing a Special Prosecutor over the Trayvon Martin case.  The governor ultimately decided it was in the best interest of the community to elect a Special Prosecutor to the case.

References

Jury Finds Senator Gary Siplin Guilty Of Grand Theft, WFTV.com, August 15, 2006.
Republican Senate President Ken Pruitt allows Siplin to remain in Florida Senate
Senator Siplin All Smiles As Probation Gets Delayed By Appeal, WFTV.com, November 29, 2006.

External links
Gary Siplin official website
Florida State Legislature - Senator Gary Siplin official government website
Project Vote Smart - Senator Gary Siplin (FL) profile
Follow the Money - Gary Siplin
2006 2004 2002 2000 campaign contributions
Siplin v. State, No. 5D06-4071 (Fla. 5th DCA, Dec. 28, 2007)
Business IT Services Inc Gary Siplin's IT Consultant

1954 births
Living people
Democratic Party Florida state senators
People from Orlando, Florida
Johnson C. Smith University alumni
African-American state legislators in Florida
Duquesne University alumni
University of Pittsburgh alumni
21st-century African-American people
20th-century African-American people